Pleurodictyum is an extinct genus of tabulate corals, characterized by polygonal corallites. Colonies commonly encrust hard substrates such as rocks, shells and carbonate hardgrounds.

Distribution 
Fossils of Pleurodictyum have been found in:

Silurian
Argentina, Australia, Bolivia, Tajikistan, and the United States (Kentucky, Wisconsin)

Devonian
Algeria, Australia, Bolivia, Brazil, Canada (Ontario), China, Colombia (Floresta Formation, Altiplano Cundiboyacense), the Czech Republic, France, Germany, Luxembourg, New Zealand, South Africa, Spain, Tajikistan, Turkey, the United Kingdom,  United States (Indiana, Kentucky, Michigan, New York, Ohio, Pennsylvania, Tennessee), and Venezuela

Carboniferous
Czech Republic, Mexico, and the United States (Georgia)

References 

Tabulata
Prehistoric Hexacorallia genera
Devonian animals of Africa
Devonian animals of Asia
Paleozoic animals of Australia
Devonian animals of Europe
Carboniferous animals of Europe
Silurian animals of North America
Devonian animals of North America
Carboniferous animals of North America
Devonian Canada
Carboniferous Mexico
Silurian United States
Devonian United States
Carboniferous United States
Fossils of Georgia (U.S. state)
Devonian animals of South America
Silurian Argentina
Silurian Bolivia
Devonian Bolivia
Devonian Brazil
Devonian Colombia
Fossils of Colombia
Silurian first appearances
Late Devonian animals
Carboniferous extinctions
Fossil taxa described in 1829
Paleozoic life of Ontario
Floresta Formation